Eupithecia cognizata is a moth in the family Geometridae. It is found in central coastal California.

Adults have been recorded on the wing from January to March and in November.

References

Moths described in 1910
cognizata
Moths of North America